The 2020 NXT Halloween Havoc was the first annual Halloween Havoc professional wrestling event produced by WWE, and 13th Halloween Havoc event overall. It was held exclusively for wrestlers from the promotion's NXT brand division. The event aired as a special episode of WWE's weekly television series NXT, broadcast on the USA Network. It took place on October 28, 2020, at the Capitol Wrestling Center, hosted at the WWE Performance Center in Orlando, Florida. The television special was hosted by NXT wrestler Shotzi Blackheart.

Halloween Havoc was previously held as an annual pay-per-view event by World Championship Wrestling (WCW) from 1989 to 2000. The 2000 event was the last Halloween Havoc held by WCW, as the company was acquired by WWE, then known as the World Wrestling Federation (WWF), in 2001; the WWF was renamed to WWE in 2002. With the scheduling of the 2021 event, Halloween Havoc became an annual event for WWE's NXT brand.

Five matches were contested during the event. In the main event, Io Shirai defeated Candice LeRae in a Tables, Ladders, and Scares match to retain the NXT Women's Championship. In other prominent matches, Dexter Lumis defeated Cameron Grimes in a Haunted House of Terror match, and in the opening bout, Johnny Gargano defeated Damian Priest to win the NXT North American Championship in a Devil's Playground Match.

Production

Background 
Halloween Havoc was an annual professional wrestling pay-per-view event produced by World Championship Wrestling (WCW) from 1989 to 2000. As the name implies, it was a Halloween-themed show held in October. The 2000 event was the final Halloween Havoc produced by WCW as WWE—at that time still known as the World Wrestling Federation—purchased WCW in 2001. After 19 years since the acquisition of WCW, WWE announced that they would be reviving Halloween Havoc to be held as a television special for the company's developmental brand, NXT. The event took place on October 28, 2020, and aired as a special episode of NXT on the USA Network. It was the 13th Halloween Havoc event overall and NXT wrestler Shotzi Blackheart served as the host for the event.

Impact of the COVID-19 pandemic
Due to the COVID-19 pandemic, WWE's NXT events had to be presented from a behind closed doors set at NXT's home base of Full Sail University in Winter Park, Florida since mid-March; WWE's programming for Raw and SmackDown were also done in this manner but at the WWE Performance Center in Orlando, Florida, before moving to Orlando's Amway Center in August in a setup dubbed the WWE ThunderDome (the ThunderDome was then relocated to Tropicana Field in St. Petersburg, Florida in December). In October 2020, it was announced that beginning with TakeOver 31, NXT would be moving their events to the Performance Center, which would feature the new "Capitol Wrestling Center" setup, an homage to the Capitol Wrestling Corporation, the predecessor to WWE. Like the ThunderDome for Raw and SmackDown, LED boards were placed around the Performance Center so that fans could attend virtually, while additionally, friends and family members of the wrestlers were in attendance, along with a limited number of actual live fans, divided from each other by plexiglass walls.

Storylines 
NXT Halloween Havoc featured professional wrestling matches that involved different wrestlers from pre-existing scripted feuds and storylines. Wrestlers portrayed heroes, villains, or less distinguishable characters in scripted events that built tension and culminated in a wrestling match or series of matches. Results were predetermined by WWE's writers on the NXT brand, while storylines were produced on the weekly television program, NXT.

Results

Notes

References

External links 
 

Halloween Havoc
2020 in professional wrestling in Florida
2020 in professional wrestling
Events in Orlando, Florida
October 2020 events in the United States
Professional wrestling in Orlando, Florida
Holidays themed professional wrestling events
WWE NXT